Kelly Murphy (born 3 November 1989) is an Irish racing cyclist, who currently rides for UCI Women's Continental Team . She was elite women's national champion in the time trial event in 2018 & 2019 and represented Ireland in this event at the European and World Championships in these same years.  At the 2019 European Road Championships, Murphy finished 10th in the TT and in doing so became the first Irish woman to place within the top 10 at any international road event.

Murphy also represents Ireland on the track, most notably for women's team pursuit.  Together with Mia Griffin, Lara Gillespie and Alice Sharpe, Murphy was part of the line up that set a new Irish record of 4:21.368 at the 2020 UCI Track Cycling World Championships in Berlin, finishing 8th place in the process.  The same quartet came close to this time again at the 2021 UCI Track Cycling Nations Cup in St. Petersburg, where they won the gold medal against Russia, becoming the first women's team pursuit squad to medal at an international event.  Later in that same competition, Murphy rode in the women's individual pursuit and set a new national record of 3:29.510 in qualifying, then went on to win a second gold against Russia in the medal ride-off.

Before turning to cycling full-time in 2018, Murphy completed a doctoral degree in Brain Imaging & Cognitive Neuroscience at Aston University, her PhD thesis is entitled: "On the Neural Basis of Reading: Using Interactions Between Semantics and Phonology to Dissociate Typical, Deviant and Delayed Reading with Functional Magnetic Resonance Imaging and Magnetoencephalography"

References

External links

1989 births
Living people
Irish female cyclists
Place of birth missing (living people)
20th-century Irish women
21st-century Irish women
Cyclists from Greater London
People from Hillingdon
Alumni of Aston University